Dog City may refer to:

Dog City, an animated television series aired from 1992 to 1994
Dog City (Crack the Sky album)
Dog City (Matt Mays album)